The Haunting of Bly Manor is an American gothic romance drama streaming television miniseries created by Mike Flanagan, and released on October 9, 2020 by Netflix. The second entry in Flanagan's The Haunting anthology series, it mostly acts as an adaptation of the 1898 novella The Turn of the Screw by Henry James, but also includes other elements either based on James' other works or created for the show. It features much of Hill Houses crew and some of the same cast, such as Victoria Pedretti, Oliver Jackson-Cohen, Amelia Eve, T'Nia Miller, Rahul Kohli, Tahirah Sharif, Amelie Bea Smith, Benjamin Evan Ainsworth, and Henry Thomas, though Pedretti, Jackson-Cohen and Thomas returned from Hill House as different characters, as did Kate Siegel, Carla Gugino, and Catherine Parker in recurring roles; the two series' narratives are not connected.

Following a nonlinear narrative, The Haunting of Bly Manor follows the events occurring in the eponymous countryside manor in the United Kingdom, mostly upon the arrival of a young American hired as an au pair for the two children living at Bly, and who is unaware that the manor is haunted. It was released on October 9, 2020, and like its predecessor received positive reviews from critics, who particularly praised the performance of Pedretti. At the 73rd Primetime Emmy Awards, the series was nominated for Outstanding Sound Editing for a Limited or Anthology Series. At the 1st Critics' Choice Super Awards, it received nominations for Best Horror Series and Best Actress in a Horror Series (Pedretti and Miller). At the 2021 MTV Movie & TV Awards, Pedretti won the award for Most Frightened Performance.

Synopsis
"The story tells of a young au pair hired by a man to look after his niece and nephew at the family country house after they fall into his care. Arriving at the Bly estate, she begins to see apparitions that proceed to haunt the premises."

Cast

Main
 Victoria Pedretti as Danielle "Dani" Clayton, a young American woman hired as an au pair for the children of the wealthy Wingrave family in England. Dani moves to England to escape her traumatic past, and quickly becomes subject to the paranormal happenings of Bly Manor.
 Elizabeth Allhands as Young Dani
 Oliver Jackson-Cohen as Peter Quint, a former executive assistant to Henry Wingrave who frequently visited Bly Manor before Dani's arrival. His ghost continues to haunt the mansion's grounds.
 Amelia Eve as Jamie Taylor, Bly Manor's dry-witted gardener and Dani’s love interest.
 Carla Gugino as Older Jamie / The Storyteller, who recounts the events of the series to the guests of a wedding in Northern California in 2007.
 T'Nia Miller as Hannah Grose, the housekeeper of Bly Manor who is fiercely protective of the grounds and the Wingrave children.
 Rahul Kohli as Owen Sharma, Bly Manor's cook who frequently spends time away from the grounds to care for his ailing mother.
 Kamal Khan as Older Owen
 Tahirah Sharif as Rebecca Jessel, Dani's deceased predecessor who began working at Bly Manor a year before Dani's arrival. Rebecca was in a romantic relationship with Peter Quint prior to her death.
 Amelie Bea Smith as Flora Wingrave, the younger child of the late Dominic and Charlotte Wingrave. Flora has a habit of making effigies of the manor's residents, and maintains a large dollhouse modeled after the mansion.
 Christie Burke as Older Flora / The Bride
 Alice Comer as Younger Flora
 Benjamin Evan Ainsworth as Miles Wingrave, the eccentric older Wingrave child who has lived with his sister in Bly Manor ever since his expulsion from a boarding school.
 Thomas Nicholson as Older Miles / The Bride's Brother
 Kasen Kelly as Younger Miles
 Henry Thomas as Henry Wingrave, Miles and Flora's estranged uncle who hires Dani as an au pair at Bly Manor.
 Duncan Fraser as Older Henry / The Father of the Bride

Recurring
 Greg Sestero as the Fiancé / James
 Jim Piddock as Father Stack
 Calix Fraser as Doll Face Ghost
 Roby Attal as Edmund "Eddie" O'Mara, Dani's fiancé who died in a car accident prior to her move to London. Eddie's ghost continues to haunt Dani in the present day as a manifestation of the guilt she feels for his death.
 Daxton Gujral as Young Eddie
 Lynda Boyd as Judy O'Mara, Eddie's mother.
 Teryl Rothery as Karen Clayton, Dani's mother.
 Alex Essoe as Charlotte Wingrave, Miles and Flora's late mother.
 Matthew Holness as Dominic Wingrave, Miles and Flora's late father and Henry's brother.
 Lizzy McInnerny as Elspeth
 Kate Siegel as Viola Willoughby-Lloyd, heiress and original owner of Bly Manor centuries ago.
 Daniela Dib as The Lady of the Lake
 Katie Parker as Perdita Willoughby-Lloyd, Viola's younger sister.
 Martin McCreadie as Arthur Lloyd, Viola's husband who initially courts Perdita.
 Liam Raymond Dib as the Plague Doctor

Episodes

Production

Development
In an interview with Entertainment Weekly in October 2018, on the topic of The Haunting of Hill House, Flanagan said, "I don't want to speculate too much about season two until Netflix, Paramount and Amblin let us know if they want one. What I will say, though, is that as far as I've ever been concerned with this, the story of the Crain family is told. It's done."

On February 21, 2019, Netflix announced a follow-up series to Hill House. Titled The Haunting of Bly Manor, it is based on The Turn of the Screw by Henry James. Though it would serve as a follow-up series to The Haunting of Hill House, it is a standalone story, indicating that there would be "no dramatic link between The Haunting of Bly Manor and its predecessor." Although the prominent source for the adaptation is The Turn of the Screw, the season also adapts (some more loosely) multiple James works, some of which had never been adapted previously, including "The Romance of Certain Old Clothes" and "The Jolly Corner".

Casting
Victoria Pedretti and Oliver Jackson-Cohen return as new characters: Pedretti in the role of Dani, "a governess who takes care of two very unusual children", and Jackson-Cohen portrays Peter, "a charming fellow". Henry Thomas, Carla Gugino, Kate Siegel, and Catherine Parker also returned for Bly Manor.

Filming
The Haunting of Bly Manor entered production on September 30, 2019, filming in Vancouver, Canada. Filming wrapped on February 21, 2020, less than a month before the response to the COVID-19 pandemic shut down much of North America.

Reception

Reviews 
On review aggregator Rotten Tomatoes, 88% of 104 critics positively reviewed The Haunting of Bly Manor, and the average rating is 7.4/10. The critical consensus reads, "It may not be as scary as its predecessor, but with plenty of spooky tricks inside its haunted halls and a strong sense of heart, The Haunting of Bly Manor is another solid entry into Mike Flanagan's growing horrorography." At Metacritic, the series received a weighted average score of 63 out of 100 based on 18 critics, indicating "generally favorable reviews".

Awards

See also 
 Other adaptations of The Turn of the Screw

References

External links
 
 
 The Haunting of Bly Manor at Amblin Television

2020 American television series debuts
2020s American drama television miniseries
2020s American horror television series
2020s American mystery television series
2020s American supernatural television series
2020s American LGBT-related drama television series
Dreams in fiction
English-language Netflix original programming
Horror drama television series
Lesbian-related television shows
Murder in television
Sororicide in fiction
Television series about ghosts
Television shows about dreams
Television shows about spirit possession
Television shows based on American novels
Television shows based on British novels
Television series by Amblin Entertainment
Television series by Paramount Television
Television series set in 1986
Television series set in 1987
Television series set in 2007
LGBT speculative fiction television series
Television shows set in the United Kingdom
Works set in country houses
The Turn of the Screw